Pedro del Castillo (Villalba de Rioja, 1521 - Panama City, 28 March 1569) was a Spanish conquistador.

Biography 
After acting as corregidor in some recently founded American towns, he was in Chile at the orders of Francisco de Villagra, with whom he took part in the Arauco War.

In November 1560 he was appointed by the Governor of Chile, García Hurtado de Mendoza, as capitán general y teniente gobernador para poblar, fundar, repartir tierras y encomendar indios en la provincia de Cuyo (commander-in-chief and plenipotentiary for the province of Cuyo), in what is now western Argentina. Castillo organized and expedition that crossed the Andes, passing through the Aconcagua and Uspallata valleys, reaching the Huentata valley on 22 February.

On 2 March 1561, Pedro del Castillo founded the city of Mendoza. Some time later, he was sent to Lima, Peru, and afterwards he established himself in Panama. He died in Panama City in 1569.

References 

1521 births
1569 deaths
People from La Rioja
Spanish conquistadors
People of colonial Argentina